Richard J. Burke (28 October 1920 – 2004) was an English professional footballer. A left back or right back, he played in the Football League for Blackpool, Newcastle United and Carlisle United.

Career
Ashton-under-Lyne-born Burke began his career with Droylsden in the 1930s. He joined Blackpool in 1938, but made only one Football League appearance in his seven years with the Seasiders.

In 1946, he joined Newcastle United, for whom he made fifteen League appearances.

In 1947, he moved a few miles south to sign for Carlisle United. He made 77 League appearances in total, and scored his first league goal for them. He scored eight in total for United.

References

1920 births
2004 deaths
Footballers from Ashton-under-Lyne
English footballers
Droylsden F.C. players
Blackpool F.C. players
Newcastle United F.C. players
Carlisle United F.C. players
Ashton United F.C. players
Association football fullbacks